Nusrat al-Din Abu Bakr, was the ruler (atabeg) of the Eldiguzids from 1191 to 1210. He used the titles of Jahan-pahlavan ("champion of the world"), al-Malik al-Mu'azzam ("the respected king"), and Shahanshah al-A'zam ("the great king of kings").

Sources 
 

12th-century monarchs in the Middle East
13th-century monarchs in the Middle East
1210 deaths
12th-century births
13th-century Turkic people
12th-century Turkic people
Shahanshahs
Eldiguzids